Loudwire is an American online media magazine that covers news of hard rock and heavy metal artists. It is owned by media and entertainment business Townsquare Media. Since its launch in August 2011, Loudwire has secured exclusive interviews with high-profile artists such as Slipknot, Ozzy Osbourne, Metallica, Judas Priest, Guns N' Roses, Megadeth, Iron Maiden, Kiss, Mötley Crüe, Suicidal Tendencies and many others. Loudwire has also exclusively premiered new material from Judas Priest, Anthrax, Jane's Addiction, Stone Sour, Phil Anselmo, and many more of rock and metal's notable acts.

Loudwire Nights is Townsquare's nationally syndicated radio program, airing on its rock stations throughout the country, hosted by Toni Gonzalez.

One of Loudwires web series is Wikipedia: Fact or Fiction?.

Loudwire Music Awards
The magazine organizes the Loudwire Music Awards, an annual awards ceremony. The first ceremony and concert, hosted by Chris Jericho, were held on October 24, 2017, at The Novo in Los Angeles. Awards are given based on votes cast by the readers of the website.

References

External links
 

American music websites
Magazines established in 2011
Online music magazines published in the United States
Rock music mass media